Bilavər (also, Biləvər, Billidyul’, and Bilyavar) is a village and municipality in the Lerik Rayon of Azerbaijan.

Demography 

It has a population of 688.

Geography 

The municipality consists of the villages of Bilavər, Kekonu, and Osyedərə.

References 

 

Populated places in Lerik District